Salim Rubai Ali (17 June 1934 – 26 June 1978), known by his comrades as "Salimin", was the Marxist head of state of the People's Democratic Republic of Yemen (South Yemen) from 22 June 1969 until his execution on 26 June 1978.

Rubai Ali led the left wing of the National Front for the Liberation of South Yemen (NLF), which forced the British to withdraw from southern Yemen on 29 November 1967. Rubai Ali's radical Marxist faction gained dominance over the more moderate President Qahtan al-Shaabi's elements, allowing Rubai Ali to seize power; he retained the title of Chairman of the Presidential Council throughout his term, even as the NF changed the name of the country from the People's Republic of South Yemen to the People's Democratic Republic of Yemen in 1970. 

Rubai Ali's National Front joined with other parties in 1975, creating the United Political Organisation NF (التنظيم السياسي الموحد الجبهة القومية), all rival parties were outlawed earlier. He opposed the idea of the Yemeni Socialist Party's (YSP) future creation promoted by Abdul Fattah Ismail. He appointed Muhammad Ali Haitham as his Prime Minister when he became chairman. Haitham served until August 1971, when he was replaced by Ali Nasir Muhammad. In 1978, Ali Nasir Muhammad overthrew and executed Rubai Ali.

References

Links
 Ahmad Salmin about his father for the first time, alshibami.net; accessed December 3, 2014.
 Salim Rubai Ali with his son, alshibami.net; accessed December 3, 2014.
 President Salim Rubai Ali on board of the Soviet vessel from Nishtun to Socotra (January 1978), pics.photographer.ru; accessed December 3, 2014.

1930s births
1978 deaths
Presidents of South Yemen
Yemeni Marxists
Executed presidents
Yemeni socialists
Communism in Yemen
Date of birth unknown
Place of birth missing